Amazing X-Men is the name of two X-Men comic book series from Marvel Comics.  The first was a limited series published during the Age of Apocalypse storyline.  The subsequent ongoing series began in November 2013 in the aftermath of Battle of the Atom and was initially written by Jason Aaron with art by Ed McGuinness, featuring a lineup of long-time X-Men characters led by Wolverine.  The first story arc features the return of Nightcrawler, who had been dead since the 2010 story line, X-Men Second Coming. The second series ended in 2015, with issue 19 being the last issue.

Publication history

Limited series (1995)
The original Amazing X-Men was a four-issue limited series that replaced X-Men during the 1995 alternate universe storyline Age of Apocalypse, in which all X-titles were given new names and issue numbers. The Amazing X-Men consisted of team leader Quicksilver and Storm, Dazzler, Banshee, Iceman, and Exodus. The team is sent to Maine by Magneto to aid in the evacuation of humanity to Europe. During this mission, the team fights Apocalypse's Brotherhood of Chaos, as well as the Horseman Abyss, who is defeated (but not killed) by Banshee. During their absence from the Xavier Mansion, Magneto and Bishop are attacked by Apocalypse himself, who captures them both. Fulfilling their mission, Quicksilver splits up his team to help the other X-Men: sending Iceman to rendezvous with Rogue's team (the Astonishing X-Men) and Dazzler and Exodus to find Magneto's son, Charles. Finally, Quicksilver, Storm, and Banshee go to rescue Bishop, who is in the hands of the Madri, Apocalypse's priests.

Ongoing series (2013–2015)
Starting in 2013, Marvel began using the title Amazing X-Men for an ongoing X-Men series written by Jason Aaron and illustrated by Ed McGuinness. The first arc of the book is a continuation of a storyline in Wolverine and the X-Men and sees a team of X-Men searching for deceased member Nightcrawler in the afterlife. With All-New X-Men featuring time-displaced original X-Men, Uncanny X-Men featuring Cyclops's renegade X-Men team, Wolverine and the X-Men featuring the Jean Grey School's staff and students in the school setting, and X-Men featuring an all-female X-Men team, Amazing X-Men became the main title to feature Wolverine's X-Men team, replacing Marjorie Liu's Astonishing X-Men, which ended a month before.  The premiere issue featured Firestar in her first appearance as a member of the X-Men, though she made her Marvel Comics debut in Uncanny X-Men #193 (1985) as a member of the X-Men's rival team, the Hellions.

Starting with issue #8, Aaron was replaced by former New X-Men and X-Force writers Craig Kyle and Chris Yost as series writers. Also in issue #8 Colossus rejoins the X-Men after being last seen being part of Cable's X-Force. This series was cancelled with issue #19.

Team roster

Collected Editions

Volume 1

Volume 2

References

2013 comics debuts
Widescreen comics